Abraham Letu Shatimuene (born 2 April 1986 in Windhoek) is a Namibian footballer, who currently plays for United Africa Tigers.

Career
On 1 July 2007, Shatimuene left United Africa Tigers to sign for Angolan side Primeiro de Agosto.

International career
He competed for Namibia at the 2008 Africa Cup of Nations.

References

1986 births
Living people
Footballers from Windhoek
Namibian expatriate footballers
Namibia international footballers
2008 Africa Cup of Nations players
Expatriate footballers in Angola
Association football midfielders
United Africa Tigers players
Namibian expatriate sportspeople in Angola
C.D. Primeiro de Agosto players
SK Windhoek players
Namibian men's footballers